In advanced traditional Chinese kung fu (martial arts), Neijing (Traditional Chinese: 內勁; pinyin: nèijìng) refers to the conscious control of the practitioner's qi, or "life energy", to gain advantages in combat. Nèijìng is developed by using "Neigong" (Traditional Chinese: 內功; pinyin: nèigōng) (內功), or "internal exercises," as opposed to "wàigōng" (外功), "external exercises."

Li vs. Neijing
Practitioners of kung fu refer to two separate forms of personal force: Li (Traditional Chinese: 力) refers to the more elementary use of tangible physical (or "external") force, such as that produced by muscles. Neijing (Traditional Chinese:內勁) or Neigong (Traditional Chinese: 內功), in contrast, refer to "internal" forces produced via advanced mental control over psychic energy (the qi).

The degree of Li force one can employ in kung fu depends on several variables such as resilience of muscles, strength of bones, speed and timing of attack and so on.  An effective way to enhance the Li force is to exercise one's muscles and bones by applying increasing pressure on them (weight training, gym exercises, etc.).  The stronger one's muscles and bones become, the more powerful and skillful the level of kung fu is.

On the other hand, the level of the Neijing force depends on the extent one can exercise over one's will power to release an inner qi energy. Within the framework of Chinese martial arts, every person is believed to possess the inborn energy of qi. Martial artists can harness the force of qi so that it is strong enough to be applied in combat. When qi is being directed by one's will, it is called Neijing.

The Li force is observable when it is employed. Unlike the Li force, Neijing is said to be invisible. The "pivot point" essential to Li combat is not necessary in Neijing. At the point of attack, one must ‘song’ (loosen) himself to generate all Neijing energy one possesses and direct this energy stream through one's contact point with an opponent. The contact point only represents the gateway to conduct Neijing energy at the point of attack.

The kung fu component of Li force is limited by one's physical condition. When a person passes his/her prime age, one's kung fu ability will pass the optimum level, too. The degree of kung fu will decline when muscles and bones are not as strong as they used to be. On the other hand, the kung fu aspect of Neijing is said to continually grow as long as one lives.

Training concepts
The key to unlock and nurture Neijing is said to be the practice of ‘song’ (Traditional Chinese: 鬆 ). The term ‘song’ can function as a verb which means to keep one's mind and body loose resilient and expanding like the consistency of cotton or clouds or relaxed yet concentrated like the sharp alertness of cats immediately before attack.  The term can also be used as an adjective which has the same meaning as described above.  The greater the extent one can achieve ‘song’ and minimize the use of Li, the greater the release of Neijing force.

Neijing trainees are often reminded to refrain from using the Li force, because the energy of Neijing will be locked and blocked whenever the Li force is applied. So, Neijing and Li are said to be mutually exclusive.

The Taijiquan master Yang Chengfu used the concept of ‘song’ as a benchmark in his daily teaching.  It was his daily routine to keep reminding his disciples to ‘song’ thoroughly more than 10 times when he inspected them.

References

Further reading

External links
From the Bible to Tai Chi
Li Yanxi's demonstration
 Generating Martial Power (Jin)
Taiji master Wang Yongquan’s demonstration
Taiji master Ma Yueliang’s demonstration

Chinese martial arts